Así es la suerte is a 2011 Mexican comedy film, written, produced and directed by Juan Carlos de Llaca and starring Alfonso Herrera, Mauricio Isaac and Irene Azuela. It was released on August 19, 2011.

Plot
Ramiro is a theater actor who lives away from his father and his half brother. One morning he meets a suicidal who claims to be a bird of ill omen. Despite his efforts, the young man dies in front of Ramiro and is stuck with the idea of being infected by bad luck. From that moment his life is turned upside down, while he is reunited with his family to fulfill the last wishes of his father: find the love of his life to say goodbye.

Cast
Alfonso Herrera - Guillermo
Mauricio Isaac - Ramiro
Irene Azuela - Mónica
Patricio Castillo - Vicente
Delia Casanova - Lidia
Silverio Palacios - Brujo
Ernesto Gómez Cruz - Lidia's husband
Moises Arizmendi 
Alejandro Calva - Director
José Sefami
Pilar Ixquic Mata
Fabiana Perzabal

References

External links
 

Mexican comedy films
2011 films
2010s Spanish-language films
2011 comedy films
2010s Mexican films